Taouleba (originally Taouléba) is a village in Bassar Prefecture in the Kara Region of northwestern Togo.

References

Populated places in Kara Region
Bassar Prefecture